Luo Bingzhang (courtesy names Yumen 籲門 and Ruzhai 儒齋; Posthumous name: Wenzhong 文忠; (January 9, 1793 – September 1, 1867) was an eminent Han Chinese official, military general, and devout Confucian scholar of the late Qing Dynasty in China. 

Luo raised the Green Standard Army and helped create the Xiang Army to fight effectively against the Taiping Rebellion and restore the stability of the Qing Dynasty. He was known for his strategic perception, administrative skill, but also sometimes for his ruthlessness in the execution of his policies, he arrested Shi Dakai.

Early life 
Luo was born in Hua County, Guangdong in 1793.  In 1832, at age 39, he earned the Jinshi degree, the highest level of the imperial examinations, which led to his appointment to the Hanlin Academy, a body of outstanding Chinese literary scholars who performed literary tasks for the imperial court.  Luo served in Beijing for more than 16 years.

Official Ranks 
In 1848 Vice Governor of Hubei
In 1850–1853 Governor of Hunan
In 1860–1867 Viceroy of Sichuan

Noted calligrapher
Luo was one of noted calligraphers in Qing Dynasty. Now stored in the Museum of Foshan.

References

Porter, Jonathan. Tseng Kuo-Fan's Private Bureaucracy. Berkeley: University of California, 1972.
Wright, Mary Clabaugh. The Last Stand of Chinese Conservatism: The T'ung-Chih Restoration, 1862 -1874. Stanford, CA: Stanford University Press, 1957.

1793 births
1867 deaths
Qing dynasty politicians from Guangdong
People from Huadu District
Qing dynasty calligraphers
Politicians from Guangzhou
Qing dynasty generals
Artists from Guangzhou
Political office-holders in Hubei
Political office-holders in Hunan
Political office-holders in Sichuan
Generals from Guangdong
Assistant Grand Secretaries
Viceroys of Sichuan
Members of the Green Standard Army